In Greek mythology, Dymas (Ancient Greek: Δύμας) is the name attributed to the following individuals:
 Dymas, a Mariandynian who warned the Argonauts about the cruelty of Amycus, king of the Bebrycians. Both Mariandynians and Bebrycians lived in northwestern Asia Minor.
 Dymas, a soldier who fought on the side of the Seven against Thebes. He took part in the foot-race at Opheltes' funeral games in Nemea. Dymas was wounded in battle and killed himself when the enemy started questioning him.
 Dymas, a Dorian and the ancestor of the Dymanes. His father, Aegimius, adopted Heracles' son, Hyllas. Dymas and his brother, Pamphylus, submitted to Hyllas.
 Dymas, king of Phrygia and father of Hecuba.
 Dymas, perhaps the same as the first. According to Quintus Smyrnaeus this Dymas was the father of Meges, a Trojan whose sons fought at Troy.
 Dymas, an Aulian warrior who came to fight at Troy under the leadership of Archesilaus. He died at the hands of Aeneas.
 Dymas, a Trojan soldier who fought with Aeneas and was killed at Troy.
 Dymas, was mentioned in Homer's Odyssey as a Phaeacian captain, whose daughter was a friend to the princess Nausicaa.

Notes

References 

 Apollodorus, The Library with an English Translation by Sir James George Frazer, F.B.A., F.R.S. in 2 Volumes, Cambridge, MA, Harvard University Press; London, William Heinemann Ltd. 1921. ISBN 0-674-99135-4. Online version at the Perseus Digital Library. Greek text available from the same website.
 Gaius Valerius Flaccus, Argonautica translated by Mozley, J H. Loeb Classical Library Volume 286. Cambridge, MA, Harvard University Press; London, William Heinemann Ltd. 1928. Online version at theio.com.
 Gaius Valerius Flaccus, Argonauticon. Otto Kramer. Leipzig. Teubner. 1913. Latin text available at the Perseus Digital Library.
 Homer, The Odyssey with an English Translation by A.T. Murray, PH.D. in two volumes. Cambridge, MA., Harvard University Press; London, William Heinemann, Ltd. 1919. . Online version at the Perseus Digital Library. Greek text available from the same website.
 Publius Papinius Statius, The Thebaid translated by John Henry Mozley. Loeb Classical Library Volumes. Cambridge, MA, Harvard University Press; London, William Heinemann Ltd. 1928. Online version at the Topos Text Project.
 Publius Papinius Statius, The Thebaid. Vol I-II. John Henry Mozley. London: William Heinemann; New York: G.P. Putnam's Sons. 1928. Latin text available at the Perseus Digital Library.
 Publius Vergilius Maro, Aeneid. Theodore C. Williams. trans. Boston. Houghton Mifflin Co. 1910. Online version at the Perseus Digital Library.
 Publius Vergilius Maro, Bucolics, Aeneid, and Georgics. J. B. Greenough. Boston. Ginn & Co. 1900. Latin text available at the Perseus Digital Library.
 Quintus Smyrnaeus, The Fall of Troy translated by Way. A. S. Loeb Classical Library Volume 19. London: William Heinemann, 1913. Online version at theio.com
 Quintus Smyrnaeus, The Fall of Troy. Arthur S. Way. London: William Heinemann; New York: G.P. Putnam's Sons. 1913. Greek text available at the Perseus Digital Library.

Kings of Phrygia
Achaeans (Homer)
Trojans
Dorian mythology